Skitby is a hamlet in the English county of Cumbria.

Skitby lies northeast of the village of Smithfield.

External links 

Hamlets in Cumbria
City of Carlisle